Shelter Island may refer to:

Places
 Shelter Island (Michigan), an island in Hampton Township, Michigan
 Shelter Island (Alaska), an island in the Alexander Archipelago, Alaska
 Shelter Island, Montana, an island in Flathead Lake, Montana
 Shelter Island (Hong Kong), an island in Port Shelter, Hong Kong
 Shelter Island (Western Australia), an island in Western Australia
 Shelter Island, New York, a town in Suffolk County, New York
 Shelter Island (CDP), New York, a hamlet and census-designated place in the above town
 Shelter Island Heights, New York, a hamlet and census-designated place in the above town
 Shelter Island Sound, a sound in Suffolk County, New York, surrounding Shelter Island
 Shelter Island (Fourth Lake), an island in Herkimer County, New York 
 Shelter Island, San Diego, a neighbourhood of Point Loma in San Diego, California
 Shelter Island meteorite, Mars

Other
 Shelter Island Conference, in physics, 1947
 Shelter Island (2003 film), a U.S. film released in 2003, starring Ally Sheedy
 Shelter Island (How I Met Your Mother), a 2008 episode